The grey brotula or  orange cuskeel (Bidenichthys consobrinus) is a rare species of viviparous brotula found around northern New Zealand. It inhabits rocky areas at 30–178 m depth.

References

 
 
 Tony Ayling & Geoffrey Cox, Collins Guide to the Sea Fishes of New Zealand,  (William Collins Publishers Ltd, Auckland, New Zealand 1982) 

grey botula
Endemic marine fish of New Zealand
Taxa named by Frederick Hutton
Fish of the North Island
grey botula